Damanab (also Romanized as Dāmanāb and Demnāb; also known as Dāmaneh Āb and Dāmaneh-ye Āb) is a village in Qaranqu Rural District, in the Central District of Hashtrud County, East Azerbaijan Province, Iran. At the 2006 census, its population was 1,054, in 223 families.

References 

Towns and villages in Hashtrud County